Cythioate is an organothiophosphate chemical used as an insecticide and anthelmintic. It has been sold under the trade names Cyflee and Proban, under which form it has been used for veterinary purposes against fleas.

References

Insecticides